Ogene is a style of Igbo music consisting of, and taking its name from, the ogene instrument, which is a large metal bell. The Ogene instrument has historically been made by the Igbo people of Nigeria. It is one of the most important metal instruments of the people. 

The Ogene type of bell which is commonly used as a "master instrument" in a bell orchestra in Igboland. It is an instrument of the struck idiophone class and is made of iron by specialist blacksmiths. The bell has a flattish, conical shape, and is hollow inside. The sound itself comes from the vibration of the iron body when struck, which is made to resound by the hollow inside of the bell. The iron body is usually struck with a soft wooden stick.

See also 
 Udu
 Ikoro

Notes

References 

 
 
 Instrument description page

Igbo musical instruments
Nigerian musical instruments
Struck idiophones